The 2022–23 season could be the FC Desna Chernihiv's 62nd season in existence and the club's fourth consecutive season in the top flight of Ukrainian football. During the Siege of Chernihiv  the Chernihiv Stadium and a library beside were badly damaged by a Russian airstrike. The management of Desna decided to take a 1 year off from the competition due to the destruction of his stadium. All player of the club ended their contract or they moved on loan with other club outside of Ukraine. The manager of Desna Chernihiv Dmitry Doroshko spoke about the current state of affairs in the Chernihiv "Desna" and the prospects of the club. He shared details of the state of his club and what his future prospects are. Doroshko noted that, unfortunately, today there are almost no football clubs in Ukraine, except for the capital's Dynamo and Donetsk's Shakhtar, which participate in charity matches organized in support of Ukraine, which was not affected by the war. When the tragic pages in the history of Ukraine began, when the Russian Federation declared war, Desna Chernihiv was at a training camp held in Turkey. Of the entire team, only Yevhen Selin, who is volunteering, decided to return to Ukraine. He was not afraid to go to Chernihiv and take the necessary help to the APU.At the moment, all Desna players keep in touch with each other, constantly asking questions about the condition of the football stadium (which was practically destroyed by the occupiers), as well as helping with money matters. Doroshko noted that thanks to their players, they  managed to buy a lot of equipment for the Ukrainian army. At the moment, the club has to say goodbye to players whose contracts have expired. And those players whose contracts are valid, go to other clubs on lease, if they can find a place so that they do not wait until the summer.

Players

Squad information

Transfers

In

Out

References

External links

FC Desna Chernihiv
FC Desna Chernihiv seasons
Desna Chernihiv